The Battle of Jakobstadt was a battle fought in the Great Northern War. It took place on 25 July 1704 (O.S.) / 26 July 1704 (Swedish calendar) / 5 August 1704 (N.S.) between a Swedish army under Adam Ludwig Lewenhaupt and a combined Polish/Russian force under Great Hetman Michał Serwacy Wiśniowiecki at the town of Jēkabpils in the Duchy of Courland and Semigallia. The Swedes were victorious.

Battle
Lewenhaupt divided his troops into two parts. The first formed by the Swedes and the second formed by the Lithuanians commanded by General Sapieha. The commander-in-chief of the Swedes did not intend for the Lithuanians to bear the brunt of the battle, only the Lithuanian cavalry could pursue the Russo-Poles after a hypothetical easy Swedish victory.

After disposing the troops, the Swedes marched on a broad front over the Russian lines. In the center, some battalions advanced too far and were repulsed.

Encouraged by the initial successes of the Swedes, Sapieha's son advanced with his Lithuanian contingent on the Russians. This interference with the order of the battle meant that the Russians gained the upper hand in this part of the battle and the Lithuanians already saw the battle as lost. They left the battlefield in a panic.

The Swedes retreated and reorganized, and launched a second attack in perfect battle order. This attack had the support of artillery, which quickly put the Poles to flight, leaving only the Russians on the battlefield. The sun was turning and it was facing the Russians, obstructing their sight of the enemy, and it was not possible for them to know where and with what force they were attacking the Swedes. Lewenhaupt managed with an iron fist to regain control of his troops and ordered a simultaneous salvo of all battalions on the Russian battle line. When the smoke of the powder cleared, the damage caused by the Swedish fire could be seen. The battlefield was covered by dead and wounded Russians. The remaining Russian troops retreated to their camp where they formed a circle with the food chariots, so that they could easily repel the cavalry attack and inflict considerable losses on the Swedish horsemen.

Notes and references

Jēkabpils
Jakobstadt
Conflicts in 1704
1704 in Europe
Jakobstadt
Jakobstadt
Jakobstadt
Jēkabpils, Battle of